Monsignor Doyle Catholic Secondary School is a public, Catholic High School in Cambridge, Ontario, Canada which opened in 1976 as a junior high school, and is the second smallest Catholic secondary school of the Waterloo Catholic District School Board. In the mid-1980s, Catholic education received full funding and all the Catholic junior high schools in Waterloo Region converted to high schools teaching grades 9 - 12 and OAC. 

The school bears its name after Monsignor E.A. Doyle, who was a much beloved and well-respected pastor of Cambridge. Much of his tenure was at St. Patrick Parish as a Catholic leader in the community.  He was a man of religious commitment and in recognition of his many educational contributions, the school was named in his honour. 

School teams are known as the "Doyle" Mustangs and are known for their exceptional performance in Badminton, Wrestling, Track & Field, Soccer, and Volleyball. 

The school has received public attention several times over the years due to an Anti-Bullying initiative run by the school's leadership program which saw the school participate in Family Channels Stand Up Wave. CTV also arrived for the banning, and subsequent unbanning of girl's shorts in early fall 2009, caused by female students rolling up and hemming the shorts. 

In mid-2007 the school saw a lockdown which lasted 2 hours. 

It is home to a generally large European and Newfoundlander population, and is one of the two Catholic High Schools in Cambridge, drawing students from most of South Galt.

In 2006, the school received an addition to the back of the school, adding fourteen classrooms and a second story, which removed the 12 portables that previously littered the area. The school's student council has worked towards pushing for a uniform-free week, as well as a second semi-formal, believing it to improve school spirit.

Monsignor Doyle is a member of the eight team District 8 Athletic Association

See also
List of high schools in Ontario

References

Waterloo Catholic District School Board
High schools in the Regional Municipality of Waterloo
Catholic secondary schools in Ontario
Educational institutions established in 1976
Schools in Cambridge, Ontario
1976 establishments in Ontario